Vishwanath Patekar (born 1 January 1951), better known as Nana Patekar, is an Indian actor, screenwriter, film maker, and a former Indian Territorial Army officer, mainly working in Hindi and Marathi cinema. He is regarded as one of the finest and influential actors in Indian Cinema, Patekar is recipient of three National Film Awards and four Filmfare Awards for his acting performances. He was bestowed with the Padma Shri award in 2013 for his contribution in cinema and arts.

After making his acting debut in Bollywood with the 1978 drama Gaman, Patekar acted in a few Marathi films and some Bollywood films. After acting in the Academy Award-nominated Salaam Bombay in 1988, he won the National Film Award for Best Supporting Actor and the Filmfare Award for Best Supporting Actor for his role in Parinda (1989), following with another negative role in Angaar (1992). He acted in and made his directorial debut with Prahaar: The Final Attack (1991). Patekar subsequently starred in and received critical acclaim for his performance in several commercially successful films of the 1990s, including Raju Ban Gaya Gentleman (1992); Angaar (1992), for which he won the Filmfare Award for Best Villain; Tirangaa (1993); Krantiveer (1994), for which he won the National Film Award for Best Actor and the Filmfare Award for Best Actor. Further acclaim came his way for Agni Sakshi, for which he won the third National Film Award for Best Supporting Actor; and Khamoshi: The Musical (1996).

During the early 2000s, he received praise for his performances in Shakti: The Power (2002), Ab Tak Chhappan (2004) and Apaharan (2005); the latter earned him a second Best Villain award at Filmfare and Taxi No. 9211 (2006). Patekar's gained widespread appreciation for playing a noted gangster Uday Shetty in the comedy Welcome (2007) and its sequel Welcome Back (2015), and a politician in the political thriller Raajneeti (2010). In 2016, he starred in the critically and commercially successful Marathi film Natsamrat; in which he portrayed a retired stage actor. He won the Filmfare Award for Best Actor (Marathi) for his performance.

Early life 
Nana Patekar was born as Vishwanath Patekar in a Marathi family on 1 January 1951 in Murud-Janjira of present-day Raigad District, Maharashtra. He is an alumnus of the Sir J.J. Institute of Applied Art, Mumbai.

Career 
Patekar has played many types of roles. He has played the occasional villain, but has been a hero in most of his films.
His debut film was Gaman (1978), after which he did several small roles in Marathi cinema. He did the role of Nathuram Godse in the British television series Lord Mountbatten: The Last Viceroy. He had notable roles in Aaj Ki Awaz (1984), Ankush (1986), Pratighaat (1987), Mohre (1987), Trishagni (1988), Awam (1987) and Sagar Sangam (1988).

His performance in Mira Nair's Salaam Bombay! (1988) was praised. He was noticed by the mainstream Hindi Cinema for his portrayal of a crime lord in Parinda (1989), for which he won his first National Film Award for Best Supporting Actor and was also awarded the Filmfare Best Supporting Actor Award.
He turned director with his movie Prahaar (1991), co-starring Madhuri Dixit, for which he underwent training for his role as an Indian Army officer. His role in Angaar (1992) earned him the Filmfare Best Villain Award. He co-starred with industry veteran Raaj Kumar in Tirangaa (1993). He played a truant, gambling son in Krantiveer (1994), for which he won the National Film Award for Best Actor and also won the Filmfare Award and the Star Screen Awards. Patekar portrayed the character of a ghost in the children's film Abhay, which won two awards at the 42nd National Film Festival held in 1994. He co-starred with Rishi Kapoor in Hum Dono (1995). He played a sadist husband in Agni Sakshi (1996), a deaf father to Manisha Koirala in Khamoshi (1996), a gangster in Ghulam-E-Mustafa (1997), an honest, but maverick cop in Yeshwant (1997) and a schizophrenic in Wajood (1998). He co-starred with Amitabh Bachchan in Kohram (1999), where he played an undercover Indian Army intelligence officer chasing Bachchan's incognito. His other notable films of this decade were Yugpurush (1998) and Hu Tu Tu (1999).
He starred with Aditya Pancholi as the CBI director in the crime drama Tarkieb (2000). After a hiatus of a year he returned to acting in Shakti (2002) in which he played an extremely violent father. In Ab Tak Chhappan (2004), he played a police officer who is an encounter specialist. His performance in Apaharan (2005) earned him his second Filmfare Best Villain Award as well as the Star Screen Award Best Villain. He played a taxi driver in Taxi No. 9211 (2006). Patekar has also done comic roles, such as in Welcome (2007), in which he plays a powerful crime lord in Dubai who once desired to be an actor in films. He acted in Sangeeth Sivan's film Ek (2009). He played a school headmaster in Paathshaala (2010). He also acted in Prakash Jha's multi-star political drama film Raajneeti (2010). In 2011, he starred in the critically acclaimed Shagird and a Marathi film Deool. His next film was Ram Gopal Verma's The Attacks of 26/11 (2013) based on the events of the 2008 Mumbai Attacks in which he played Joint Commissioner of Police Rakesh Maria. In 2014, he starred in another Marathi film Dr. Prakash Baba Amte – The Real Hero. In 2015, he made two sequels reprising his roles in Ab Tak Chhappan 2, sequel of Ab Tak Chhappan and Welcome Back, the sequel of Welcome. In 2016, he starred as Ganpatrao "Appa" Belwalkar in the film adaptation of the Drama Natsamrat which was highly successful critically and commercially. He did the voice acting for Sher Khan in the Hindi version of The Jungle Book (2016).

In April 2022, Patekar announced his return to the silver screen with a social-thriller drama The Confessions. This would be the first movie after a long break from the film industry of roughly four years, since his in the 2018 film Kaala.

Singing career 
Patekar did some playback singing in the films Yeshwant (1997), Wajood (1998) and Aanch (2003).

Personal life 
Patekar married Neelkanti at age 27. His father died of a heart attack when Nana was 28 and later Patekar also lost his first son. Patekar was a chain smoker until he quit at the age of 56. In an interview, he said that his father loved plays and encouraged him to watch them. This is how he developed his love for acting. Vijaya Mehta directed his first play. Patekar lives in Andheri, Mumbai in 1BHK apartment.

Patekar was commissioned as an honorary Captain in the Indian Territorial Army in 1990, after undergoing a three-year training period to prepare for the movie Prahaar, and worked with General V. K. Singh, who had the rank of Colonel at that time and had a cameo appearance. During the Kargil War in 1999, Patekar also lent his services in the Maratha Light Infantry regiment as an honorary Major.

In 2008, Tanushree Dutta accused Patekar of sexually harassing her on the sets of the movie Horn 'Ok' Pleassss. In March 2008, she filed a complaint with 'CINTAA' (Cine & TV Artists Association) but no action was taken then. This allegation was repeated in an interview in 2013 and again made in 2018. In late 2018, CINTAA apologized to Dutta admitting that the "chief grievance of sexual harassment wasn't even addressed (in 2008)" but added that since the case was more than three years old, they could not reopen it.

In 2018, Dutta restated her accusation of sexual harassment by Patekar in 2018, and her accusations led to the Me Too movement coming to Bollywood. Subsequently, she complained to the Maharashtra Women Commission and demanded an investigation into the allegations of harassment levelled by her against Patekar, Ganesh Acharya, producer Samee Siddiqui, director Rakesh Sarang, and several Maharashtra Navnirman Sena (MNS) party workers. In the late hours of 10 October 2018, An FIR was registered against Patekar and three others at Oshiwara police station following a complaint by Dutta late on Wednesday night. Patekar, choreographer Ganesh Acharya, director Rakesh Sarang and producer Samee Siddiqui were booked for molestation and obscenity under the Indian Penal Code (IPC).

In June 2019, Patekar was cleared of the sexual harassment charges. The B-Summary report filed by the Oshiwara police station in Mumbai said that the complaint filed by Dutta could be "malicious" and "out of revenge". Dutta said that her lawyers may approach the Bombay High Court to reopen the case.

Philanthropy 
Patekar is known for his simple lifestyle and his generosity in donating to charities. He contributed money towards rebuilding of the flood ravaged villages in Bihar through the charitable organisation Anubhuthi. All the monetary remuneration he obtained for his performance in the movie Paathshaala was donated by him to five different charitable organisations. When he was awarded the Raj Kapoor award which carries a cash prize of Rs , he donated the entire amount towards drought relief activities in Maharashtra. He also provided financial aid to families of farmers who committed suicide due to indebtedness brought about by drought. He distributed cheques worth Rs 15,000 to 62 families of farmers from Vidarbha region in August 2015 and another 113 families from Latur and Osmanabad districts of Marathwada in September 2015. 

In September 2015, Patekar established the Naam Foundation, with fellow Marathi actor Makarand Anaspure, which works to provide aid to farmers overcome by drought conditions in Maharashtra.

Using a Twitter campaign with the hashtag IcareIsupport, Patekar was able to obtain funds to help Maharashtra drought victims.

Awards and recognition 

Patekar was given the Padma Shri award for his dedication in the field of Films and Arts in 2013 on the eve of 64th Republic Day.
 Patekar, along with Irrfan Khan, is the only actor ever to win Filmfare Awards in the Best Actor, Best Supporting Actor and Best Villain categories.

Filmography

References

External links

Further reading 
 Interview with Patekar

Indian male film actors
1951 births
Living people
Marathi people
Male actors from Maharashtra
Indian filmmakers
Male actors in Hindi cinema
Best Actor National Film Award winners
Best Supporting Actor National Film Award winners
International Indian Film Academy Awards winners
Recipients of the Padma Shri in arts
Sir Jamsetjee Jeejebhoy School of Art alumni
People from Raigad district
Filmfare Awards winners
Screen Awards winners
Zee Cine Awards winners